Abdul Ghani Malik (born 25 May 1972) is a former Malaysian footballer. He is a former member of the Malaysian national team. Currently he works as assistant coach in the Uitm F.C. football team.

Career
Starting his career in the Kuala Lumpur youth team, he was promoted to the senior squad in 1993. He also played for Perak, Terengganu and Pahang state teams in Malaysian league, as well as club teams such as Maju United, MPPJ FC and TNB Kelantan, the club where he concludes his playing career.

His accolades during his playing careers including winning the 2001 Malaysia Cup with Terengganu, 2004 Super League championship with Pahang, 2000 Malaysia FA Cup with Terengganu and Malaysia Charity Shield with Kuala Lumpur (1994) and Terengganu (2001). He also received Pingat Jasa Kebaktian award from the government of Terengganu after winning the Malaysia Cup for Terengganu.

National team
Ghani represented the Malaysia national football team from 1995 to 2001. He was in the squad for the SEA Games in 1995 and 1997, and also in the Tiger Cup squad in 1998 and 2000. He helped Malaysia gain third place in the 2000 Tiger Cup, beating Vietnam 3-0 in the third place play-off. He was also featured in the Malaysian team that faces Arsenal F.C. in a 1999 friendly match. Malaysia lost 2-0 in that match.

He made 8 appearances for the national team, scoring 1 goal against Bahrain in the 2001 Merdeka Tournament.

International Senior Goals

References

 Most informations are taken from the article "Tuah tidak datang bergolek" by Nazri Abu Bakar, published in Berita Harian, pullout Bola, page 10-11, 16 July 2011.

External links
 

Malaysian footballers
Malaysia international footballers
Kuala Lumpur City F.C. players
Perak F.C. players
Terengganu FC players
Sri Pahang FC players
Living people
1972 births
Sportspeople from Kuala Lumpur
Association football defenders